Estonian Health Care Museum is a health museum in Tallinn, Estonia. The museum collects, exhibits and analyzes things related to healthcare in Estonia.

The museum was established in 1921. Its first exhibition, held from 1924 to 1928, had 300 exhibits borrowed from foreign museums. Before 1945, the museum was located in Tartu. In 1932, the branch was opened in Tallinn. In 1945, the museum was re-organized into the educational sanitary house. In 1950, the sanitary house was closed.

During the Soviet occupation of Estonia, the museum was closed and many of its items destroyed. The museum re-opened in 1980 in Tallinn as the Health Museum of the Centre of Sanitary Education of the Republic. In 1989, the museum changed its name back to the Estonian Health Care Museum when it reorganized as an independent entity.

References

External links
 

Museums in Tallinn
Healthcare in Estonia